Rigaux is a surname. Notable people with the surname include:

 (born 1988), French basketball player
Cécile Rigaux (born 1969), French beach volleyball player
Fernand Rigaux (1905–1962), Belgian astronomer
Jean Rigaux (1909–1991), French songwriter and actor